Paris By Night 87: PBN Talent Show - Finals is a Paris By Night program produced by Thúy Nga that was filmed at Knott's Berry Farm in Buena Park, California on February 10, 2007. This is the first Paris By Night's Talent Show. This Talent Show consists of Paris By Night 86 - Semifinal and Paris by Night 87 - Final.  After the Semi-Final, there are 7 remaining contestants in the final.

Winners

Judges' Choice: Trịnh Lam

People's Choice: David Meng

Trịnh Lam polled the most votes among the live audience, who were given ballots. The People's Choice award also includes internet and phone voting where there is no limit on how many times one can vote.

Track list
Disk 1
 Ngôi Sao Đêm Nay (Fame) – 13 Thí Sinh & Paris By Night Dancers
 Giới Thiệu Ban Giám Khảo – Thái Thanh, Shanda Sawyer, Nhật Ngân, Đức Huy, Huỳnh Thi
 All I Want – Roni Trọng
 Người Đàn Ông Chân Thật – David Meng
 Nỗi Buồn Chim Sáo – Ngọc Loan
 Có Phải Em Mùa Thu Hà Nội – Hương Giang
 Mưa Hồng – Quỳnh Vi
 Bay Cùng Tình Yêu – Mai Tiến Dũng
 Giọt Nắng Bên Thềm – Trần Thái Hòa
 Một Lần Cuối – Trịnh Lam
 Tình Yêu Vội Đi – Ngọc Liên
 Hai Kich: Mộng Ca Sĩ – Hoài Linh, Chí Tài, Hữu Lộc, Calvin Hiệp

Disk 2
 Chiều Một Mình Qua Phố – Quang Dũng
 Chỉ Có Một Thời – Quang Dũng
 Unchain My Heart – Khánh Hà, Hoài Phương, Trịnh Lam
 Chồng Xa – Tâm Đoan, Văn Phi Thông, Ngọc Loan
 Vầng Trăng Khóc – Roni Trọng, Mai Tiến Dũng, Triệu Bảo Vi, Hương Giang, Quỳnh Vi
 Cát Bụi Tình Xa – Ngọc Liên, Trần Thái Hòa, Ngô Quang Minh, Huy Tâm
 Trả Hết Cho Người – Nguyễn Hưng, David Meng, Sunny Lương
 Sóng Về Đâu – Khánh Hà
 Cho Vừa Lòng Em – Tâm Đoan
 Biết Làm Gì Hơn – Nguyễn Hưng
 Sometimes When We Touch – Lưu Bích
 Còn Lại Nhớ Thương – Tú Quyên
 Ngôi Sao Đêm Nay (Fame) – Hợp Ca

Bonus
 Hạnh Phúc Quanh Đây (MTV) – Mai Quốc Huy
 Ru Em – Văn Phi Thông
 Không Còn Mùa Thu – Huy Tâm
 Đam Mê – Triệu Bảo Vi
 Xin Lỗi Tình Yêu – Sunny Lương
 Trái Tim Hoang Đường – Hoài Phương
 Đêm Đông – Ngô Quang Minh

Paris by Night

vi:Paris By Night 87